Thalassery State assembly constituency is one of the 140 state legislative assembly constituencies in Kerala. It is also one of the 7 state legislative assembly constituencies included in the Vatakara Lok Sabha constituency. As of the 2021 assembly elections, the MLA is A. N. Shamseer of CPI(M).

Local self-governed segments
Thalassery Niyamasabha constituency is composed of the following local self governed segments:

Members of Legislative Assembly
The following list contains all members of Kerala legislative assembly who have represented Thalassery Niyamasabha Constituency during the period of various assemblies:

Key

* indicates bypolls

Election results

Niyamasabha Election 2021 
There were 1,75,143 registered voters in the constituency for the 2021 election.

Niyamasabha Election 2016 
There were 1,67,024 registered voters in the constituency for the 2016 election.

Niyamasabha Election 2011 
There were 1,49,689 registered voters in the constituency for the 2011 election.

1952

See also
 Thalassery
 Kannur district
 List of constituencies of the Kerala Legislative Assembly
 2016 Kerala Legislative Assembly election

References

Assembly constituencies of Kerala

State assembly constituencies in Kannur district